Myristica globosa is a species of plant in the family Myristicaceae. It is found in parts of  Melanesia and Australia.

Two subspecies are recognised:
M. globosa subsp. chalmersii (Warb.) W.J.de Wilde, found in New Guinea, the Bismark Archipelago and the Solomon Islands
M. globosa subsp. muelleri (Warb.) W.J.de Wilde (Queensland nutmeg) found in Queensland and the Solomon Islands.

References

globosa
Near threatened plants
Flora of Australia
Flora of Papua New Guinea
Flora of the Solomon Islands (archipelago)
Taxonomy articles created by Polbot